Ndaba Dube (born 7 January 1959) is a former boxer who competed in the bantamweight (– 54 kg) division at the 1984 Summer Olympics and at the 1988 Summer Olympics.

Dube won a silver medal at the 1987 All-Africa Games, losing in the bantamweight final to Stephen Mwema of Kenya.

Olympic results
Represented Zimbabwe as a Bantamweight at the 1984 Olympic Games.
1st round bye
Defeated Amon Neequaye (Ghana) 5-0
Defeated Louis Gomis (France) 5-0
Lost to Héctor López (Mexico) 0-5

Represented Zimbabwe as a Bantamweight at the 1988 Olympic Games.
Defeated Lionel Francis (Antigua and Barbuda) RSC-2
Lost to Aleksandr Artemyev (Soviet Union) RSC-1

References

1959 births
Living people
Bantamweight boxers
Olympic boxers of Zimbabwe
Boxers at the 1984 Summer Olympics
Boxers at the 1988 Summer Olympics
African Games silver medalists for Zimbabwe
African Games medalists in boxing
Zimbabwean male boxers
Competitors at the 1987 All-Africa Games